Meridiorhantus calidus is a species of predaceous diving beetle in the family Dytiscidae. It is found in North America and the Neotropics. This species was formerly a member of the genus Rhantus.

References

Dytiscidae
Beetles described in 1792